The Eugene Science Center, located in Alton Baker Park in Eugene, Oregon, United States, is a science and technology center for children, families, and school groups. The  museum near Autzen Stadium features changing interactive exhibits, planetarium shows, camp programs, special events and other science and technology-related education programs. Eugene Science Center is an independent 501(c)(3) non-profit organization governed by a volunteer board of directors. Its mission is: "To engage children, excite their curiosity, inspire them toward a lifetime love of science, and empower them to use science and technology to improve their communities." Eugene Science Center is the only science museum in Lane County and surrounding counties.

History 

Eugene Science Center was founded in 1961 as the Southwest Oregon Museum of Science and Industry (SWOMSI). SWOMSI received initial support from its parent organization, Oregon Museum of Science and Industry (OMSI) of Portland, but soon after became an independent museum with a board of directors composed primarily of local educators.

SWOMSI first occupied the Oregon Electric Railway Station, currently the Oregon Electric Station restaurant, located at 5th Avenue and Willamette Street. During its early years in the Oregon Electric Railway Station, SWOMSI offered exhibits and classes and ran planetarium shows in the Spitz Planetarium, a facility operated by OMSI.

In 1973, finding the railroad station inadequate and the Spitz Planetarium nearing the end of its useful life, SWOMSI's Board of Directors approached the Lane County Commissioners to ask for space in the newly created Alton Baker Park. Following a break from OMSI, SWOMSI became the Willamette Science and Technology Center (WISTEC). Major funding for the new museum was obtained under the Economic Development Administration and each of the consortium members (Lane Community College, Lane Education Service District, University of Oregon, and WISTEC) contributed substantially to the project, financially and through in-kind services. At that time, the Oregon Electric Railway Station was sold and $50,000 in WISTEC funds were put into construction of the present building in Alton Baker Park.

From 1978 to 1979 the WISTEC building and the new planetarium was constructed. When the City of Eugene took control of most of Alton Baker Park in the mid-1980s, it also took ownership of the WISTEC building. WISTEC opened at its present location in 1980. The planetarium was at that time functionally and financially separate from the museum. The planetarium eventually became the sole responsibility of the Lane Education Service District and was closed in December 2002, after a funding crisis. In January 2002, WISTEC changed its name to The Science Factory and with the transfer of the planetarium to Science Factory ownership in 2003, it became the Science Factory Children's Museum & Planetarium. The name reverted to Science Factory in 2016 and then formally changed to Eugene Science Center in January 2018.

Exhibits
Eugene Science Center features a planetarium and an exhibit hall with several permanent and changing exhibits.

Planetarium
Eugene Science Center Planetarium, owned and operated by the museum since 2002, seats 70 people. Its star projector is a digital Minolta series llB under a  Astro-Tec dome.  The planetarium offers live and pre-recorded digital shows to the public year-round on Friday mornings, all day on weekends, and every day during the summer. The planetarium also offers laser shows on Friday and Saturday nights.

In March 2017, the digital planetarium projector failed. After months of fundraising for a permanent replacement system, a new, state-of-the-art, projector was installed in August 2018, employing laser-phosphor technology.  The new equipment provides full-dome projection in high-contrast, 4k resolution.

Temporary exhibits
A large portion of Eugene Science Center's Exhibit Hall can be devoted to temporary traveling exhibits. Notable past exhibits include "Yesterday's Tomorrows", "Magna Carta", "Brain Teasers", "The Sound of Science", "Finding Your Way", "Tech City", "Your Healer Within", and "A View From Space."

The Tot Spot
The Tot Spot is an exploration room devoted to children five years old and younger.

Community Room
In 2017, the Eugene Science Center re-purposed its conference room into a Community Room which is open to the public during regular museum hours. The Community Room features a vending machine, a community board, and tables and chairs where guests can eat snacks or lunches during their visit.

Education
The Eugene Science Center primarily serves children from birth through 8th grade through special programs, summer camps, and field trips, and from such former specialized programs as Girls' Science Adventures, a nationally recognized program designed to provide young girls with adult female mentors who encouraged the girls to explore careers in math, science and technology. It also offers such education programs as YES!YEA! Days, an interdisciplinary literature, art and sciences program partnered with the Young Writer's Association, and once-monthly "Tot Discovery Days" for toddlers. In recent years special learning environments have been created within the exhibit space including a remodeled computer education laboratory (1998), library and video station (2007), a toddler area (2004), an upgraded classroom (2007), and an upgraded planetarium (2010).

References

External links
[http://www.eugenesciencecenter.org (official website)

Children's museums in Oregon
Science museums in Oregon
Museums established in 1961
Museums in Eugene, Oregon
1961 establishments in Oregon